The National Force is a fictional organization appearing in American comic books published by Marvel Comics.

Fictional history
The National Force was a neo-fascist organization masterminded by Doctor Faustus.

Faustus had recently gained custody of the fourth Captain America (William Burnside, although he legally changed his name to Steven Rogers) and his partner Bucky, heroes from the 1950s who had been kept in suspended animation. Faustus took control of the mind of Burnside in an attempt to use him against Steve Rogers, the original Captain America. Faustus brainwashed him into returning as "The Grand Director", the leader of the National Force.

While working as a S.H.I.E.L.D. liaison with the NYPD, Sharon Carter investigated and infiltrated the National Force. During one of the National Force's battles with street criminals in Harlem, the National Guard was sent in to put an end to it. Under the effects of a mind-altering gas, however, Sharon activated a self-destruct device in her National Force uniform and apparently committed suicide. Rogers was shown the event on videotape.

After being defeated in battle by the original Captain America and Daredevil, the Grand Director apparently committed suicide. He has since reappeared, having survived the suicide attempt. He was later shot by Captain America (Barnes) and fell off the Hoover Dam. No body was ever recovered.

A storyline from The Punisher War Journal from 2007 depicts the National Force as a terrorist syndicate with neo-Nazi ideology operating on the US-Mexico border led by a character called the Hate-Monger. The Punisher infiltrated and destroyed this version of the National Force.

Analysis
The National Force was presented as a racist organization in the comics that was a "caricature of anti-integrationist political groups" in the USA. It features elements of the Ku Klux Klan, National Socialist and white supremacy movements. The organization is portrayed as having high-ranking supporters, which "sets up the understanding that while everyday Americans may not be racist, the activities of the National Force advance the agenda of at least some elites". The presentation of the organization also connects elements of red-baiting and conservative opposition to integration from the 1950s to racism in 1979, when the National Force appeared in the comics.

According to King and Leonard, looking at the appearance in The Punisher War Journal, the racism of the National Force, undergirded by criminal acts, is depicted as clearly evil. They criticize that this presentation deflects the attention of the reader from "the less visible ways in which white racism operates today".

Appendix

Further reading
Budrow, Erin, ""Hail Hydra": Marvel's Captain America and White Nationalism in the United States" (2019). Summer Research. 344.

References

Characters created by Roger McKenzie
Characters created by Sal Buscema
Comics about neo-Nazism
Comics characters introduced in 1979
Marvel Comics neo-Nazis
Marvel Comics supervillain teams